M-9 highway (previously known as R-12 regional road) is a Montenegrin roadway.

History
First section from Vilusi to Petrovići of then R-12 regional road was reconstructed and upgraded in 2012.  Second and final section from Petrovići to border crossing Vraćenovići is being reconstructed and should be finished in 2017.

In January 2016, the Ministry of Transport and Maritime Affairs published bylaw on categorisation of state roads. With new categorisation, R-12 regional road was categorised as M-8 highway.

Major intersections

References

M-9